The 16333/34 Thiruvananthapuram–Veraval Express is an Express train belonging to Indian Railways – Southern Railway zone that runs between  and  in India.

It operates as train number 16333 from Veraval Junction to Thiruvananthapuram Central and as train number 16334 in the reverse direction, serving the states of Kerala, Karnataka, Goa, Maharashtra & Gujarat.

Originally the train began operations in 1984 as Ahmedabad–Trivandrum Express which later on was extended to Rajkot as Trivandrum–Rajkot Express. Now this train has been extended up to Veraval. Since 25 July, this train runs with LHB coach.

Coach composition

The train consists of 22 coaches:

 1 AC 2 tier
 6 AC 3 tier
 10 Sleeper class
 1 Pantry car
 2 Unreserved/General
 2 Seating cum Luggage Rake

As with most train services in India, coach composition may be amended at the discretion of Indian Railways depending on demand.

Service

Routes

Originally as Trivandrum Rajkot Express train ran on routes via Palakkad–Krishnarajapuram–Guntakal–Solapur–Pune–Vasai–Vadodara. In the early 1990s with opening the Konkan Railway the train routes were changed. Now the 16333/34 Thiruvananthapuram–Veraval Express runs from Thiruvananthapuram Central via ,
,

Schedule

Rake sharing

The train shares its rake with 12697/12698 Chennai–Thiruvananthapuram Superfast Express.

Traction

After Mangaluru Junction, both trains are hauled by a Diesel Loco Shed, Ernakulam-based WDM-3A twins up to |Veraval Junction, and vice versa.

External links

References 

Transport in Veraval
Transport in Thiruvananthapuram
Express trains in India
Rail transport in Maharashtra
Rail transport in Gujarat
Rail transport in Kerala
Rail transport in Goa
Rail transport in Karnataka
Railway services introduced in 1984